Carl Petersen may refer to:
 Carl Wilhelm Petersen (1868–1933), German politician and first mayor of Hamburg
 Carl Petersen (athlete) (1902–1983), Danish Olympic athlete
 Carl Emil Petersen (1875–1971), American Medal of Honor recipient
 Carl Petersén (born 1883) (1883–1963), Swedish military officer
 Carl Wilhelm Petersén (1884–1973), Swedish curler
 Carl Petersen (Danish politician) (1894–1984), Danish politician of the Social Democratic Party
 Carl Petersen (neuroscientist), Denmark-born Swiss neuroscientist at EPFL
 Carl Friedrich Petersen (1809–1892), Hamburg lawyer and politician
 Carl Petersen (architect) (1874–1923), Danish architect of the Nordic Classicism movement
 Sandy Petersen (born 1955), American programmer

See also
 Johan Carl Christian Petersen (1813–1880), Danish seaman and interpreter
 Carl Peterson (disambiguation)
 Carl Pettersson (disambiguation)